The athletics competitions at the 2017 Southeast Asian Games in Kuala Lumpur took place at Bukit Jalil National Stadium in Bukit Jalil. The marathon event meanwhile, was held in Putrajaya.

The 2017 Games featured competitions in forty-five events (23 events for men and 22 events for women).

Events
The following events were contested (all distances are in metres unless stated):

Schedule

Participation

Participating nations

Medal summary

Medal table

Men's events

Women's events

See also
Athletics at the 2017 ASEAN Para Games

References

External links